A mobile processor is a microprocessor designed for mobile devices such as laptops, and cell phones.

A CPU chip is designed for portable computers to run fanless, under 10 to 15W, which is cool enough without a fan. It is typically housed in a smaller chip package, but more importantly, in order to run cooler, it uses lower voltages than its desktop counterpart and has more sleep mode capability. A mobile processor can be throttled down to different power levels or sections of the chip can be turned off entirely when not in use. Further, the clock frequency may be stepped down under low processor loads. This stepping down conserves power and prolongs battery life.

In laptops 
One of the main characteristics differentiating laptop processors from other CPUs is low-power consumption, however, they are not without tradeoffs; they also tend to not perform as well as their desktop counterparts.

The notebook processor has become an important market segment in the semiconductor industry.  Notebook computers are a popular format of the broader category of mobile computers.  The objective of a notebook computer is to provide the performance and functionality of a desktop computer in a portable size and weight.

Cell phones and PDAs use "system on a chip" integrated circuits that use less power than most notebook processors.

While it is possible to use desktop processors in laptops, this practice is generally not recommended, as desktop processors heat faster than notebook processors and drain batteries faster.

Examples

Current 
 ARM architecture (used in Chromebooks, Windows 10 laptops, Linux netbooks and recent Macs)
 Apple M series
 MediaTek
 Nvidia: Tegra
 Qualcomm: Snapdragon
 Rockchip
 Samsung Electronics: Exynos
 x86
 AMD: Ryzen, Athlon, and A-Series APU
 Intel: Xeon mobile, Core, Pentium, and Celeron

Former 
 PowerPC
 Motorola and Freescale Semiconductor made PowerPC G4 processors for the pre-Intel Apple Computer notebooks.
 x86
 Transmeta: Crusoe and Efficeon
 Intel: Pentium M
 AMD: Mobile Athlon II, Mobile Athlon 64, Mobile Sempron

References 

Laptops
Mobile computers
Mobile phones
Microprocessors